The 2008 Churchill Cup took place between 7 June and 21 June 2008 in what was the sixth year of the Churchill Cup.

Participation
The entry of an Argentinian XV into the competition stems from a decision by the New Zealand Rugby Union not to assemble its 'A' team, the Junior All Blacks, in 2008; as a consequence, the New Zealand Māori, who have taken part in the last three Churchill Cup tournaments, replaced the Juniors in the Pacific Nations Cup and were not available for the Churchill Cup.

Format
The teams were split into two pools of three teams each. Within each pool, the teams played one another once. All six teams participated in a finals day: the two pool winners competed in the final for the Churchill Cup, the two runners-up played in a Plate final, and the two bottom-placed teams competed for a Bowl.

Venues
After the 2007 tournament, which was the first to be played outside of North America, the 2008 tournament returned to North America again. The pool games were played at three venues in Ontario, Canada: Fletcher's Fields, Markham; Twin Elm Rugby Park, Nepean; and Richardson Memorial Stadium, Kingston. Finals Day took place at Toyota Park, Chicago.

Fixtures

USA Pool

Canada Pool

Finals

Bowl Final

Plate Final

Cup Final

See also
 Churchill Cup

References

External links
 Churchill Cup official site

Churchill Cup
2008 rugby union tournaments for national teams
International rugby union competitions hosted by Canada
International rugby union competitions hosted by the United States
2007–08 in Irish rugby union
2007–08 in English rugby union
2008 in American rugby union
2007–08 in Scottish rugby union
2008 in Argentine rugby union
2008 in Canadian rugby union